Ashmore is a village in Dorset, England.

Ashmore may also refer to:

Places

Australia 

 Ashmore, Queensland, a suburb of the Gold Coast

New Zealand 

 Ashmore, New Zealand, a suburb of Hamilton

United Kingdom 

Ashmore Green, a hamlet in Berkshire, England
 Ashmore Park, a housing estate in Wolverhampton, West Midlands, England

United States 
 Ashmore, Illinois
 Ashmore Township, Coles County, Illinois

People
 Aaron Ashmore, Canadian actor
 Alf Ashmore, English football player
 Basil Ashmore, British theatrical director and author
 Bruce Ashmore, English race car designer
 Carl Ashmore, English author
 Darryl Ashmore, American football player
 Edward Ashmore (1919–2016), senior Royal Navy officer
 Edward Ashmore (British Army officer) (1872–1953), founder of the Royal Observer Corps
 Frank Ashmore, American actor
 George Ashmore, English football player
 Gerry Ashmore, English Formula One driver
 Harry Ashmore, American journalist
 James Ashmore (disambiguation), several people
 Jim Ashmore, American basketball player
 John Ashmore (disambiguation), several people
 Jonathan Ashmore, British physicist
 Larry Ashmore, Canadian politician
 Leslie Ashmore, British naval officer
 Lewis Ashmore, American cleric and musician
 Marion Ashmore, American football player
 Myfanwy Ashmore, Canadian conceptual artist
 P. G. Ashmore, English physical chemist
 Robert T. Ashmore, American politician
 Shawn Ashmore, Canadian actor
 Trevor Ashmore, English coin counterfeiter
 Walter Ashmore, English football player
 Wendy Ashmore, American archaeologist
 William Ashmore, English cricketer

Other
 ACV Ashmore Guardian, Australian patrol vessel
 Ashmore Group, British investment company
 Ashmore and Cartier Islands, two groups of uninhabited tropical islands in the Indian Ocean

See also
Ashmole (disambiguation)